52 Cygni is a giant star in the northern constellation of Cygnus with an apparent magnitude of 4.22.

52 Cygni is a probable horizontal branch (red clump) star, fusing helium in its core, although there is a 25% chance that it is still on the red giant branch (RGB) and fusing hydrogen in a shell around an insert core. As a clump giant it would be 2.27 billion years old, but only 910 million years if 52 Cygni is an RGB star.

At an angular separation of 6.0″ from 52 Cygni is a faint magnitude 9.5 companion.

References

G-type giants
Horizontal-branch stars
Binary stars
Cygnus (constellation)
BD+30 4167
Cygni, 52
197912
102453
7942